Montreal West was a federal electoral district in Quebec, Canada, that was represented in the House of Commons of Canada 
from 1867 to 1892.

It was created by the British North America Act, 1867. It consisted initially of St. Anne Ward, St. Antoine Ward and St. Lawrence Ward. In 1872, St. Anne Ward was removed from the riding. It was abolished in 1892 when it was redistributed into St. Antoine and St. Lawrence ridings.

Members of Parliament

This riding elected the following Members of Parliament:

Election results

By-election: On Mr. McGee being assassinated, 7 April 1868

By-election: On election being declared void, 22 October 1874

By-election: On election being declared void, 14 August 1875

See also 

 List of Canadian federal electoral districts
 Past Canadian electoral districts

External links 
 Riding history from the Library of Parliament

Former federal electoral districts of Quebec